Curron J. Adolphe was a state legislator in Louisiana. He represented New Orleans in the Louisiana House of Representatives from 1868 to 1872 as a Republican. He was African American. He worked as a grocer and served on the State Library Committee.

He also served as the State Tax Collector for the Third District.

See also
African-American officeholders during and following the Reconstruction era

References

Members of the Louisiana House of Representatives
African-American state legislators in Louisiana